Finn Holsing (born 9 August 1983) is a German former professional footballer who played as a midfielder.

References

External links
 

1983 births
Living people
People from Lübbecke
Sportspeople from Detmold (region)
German footballers
Footballers from North Rhine-Westphalia
Association football midfielders
SV Werder Bremen II players
Arminia Bielefeld players
Eintracht Braunschweig players
Eintracht Braunschweig II players
Rot-Weiss Essen players
Bundesliga players
2. Bundesliga players
3. Liga players
Regionalliga players